The Infantry Squad Vehicle (ISV) is an air-transportable high-speed, light utility vehicle selected by the United States Army in 2020 It is based on the Chevrolet Colorado ZR2 platform. An ISV can carry nine infantrymen. Fielding begins in 2021, along with Initial Operational Test and Evaluation (IOTE); 649 ISVs are to be allocated to 11 Infantry brigade combat teams (IBCTs) by 2025.

The Army will purchase 1700 ISVs to augment the stop-gap Army Ground Mobility Vehicle, which is based on the General Dynamics Flyer 72.

According to the US Army Publishing Directorate, the Infantry Squad Vehicle has been officially designated as M1301.

Development
The Infantry Squad Vehicle comprises the second phase of the Army Ground Mobility Vehicle program. The Army initiated the Ultra Light Combat Vehicle program beginning in 2014. The Army renamed this the Army Ground Mobility Vehicle in 2015. The Army never formalized a competitive bid process, but in the interim, opted to purchase a limited number of GMVs through SOCOM's Ground Mobility Vehicle 1.1 program. In its 2018 budget request, the Army split the GMV into two phases. The second phase, called the Infantry Squad Vehicle program, was initiated to acquire 1700 additional vehicles; compared to 295 A-GMV.

In 2019, the U.S. Army awarded three ISV prototype contracts to the GM Defense/Ricardo plc consortium, the Oshkosh Defense/Flyer Defense LLC consortium and the Science Applications International Corporation (SAIC)/Polaris Inc. consortium.

The GM/Ricardo prototype was based on the Chevrolet Colorado ZR2 and uses 90% commercial off the shelf parts. The Oshkosh/Flyer prototype was based on the Flyer 72 Ground Mobility Vehicle 1.1 and the SAIC/Polaris prototype was based on the Polaris DAGOR.

Prototype trials took place at Aberdeen Proving Ground in November/December 2019 followed by further trials at Fort Bragg in January 2020.

AMP-HEL
In August 2022, the Army revealed it was developing a directed energy weapon to protect IBCTs from small drones. The program is called the Army Multipurpose High Energy Laser (AMP-HEL) and plans to integrate a 20 kw laser onto an ISV in 2023, which is enough power to defend against group one and two UAVs.

Production 
In June 2020 the U.S. Army awarded GM/Ricardo a $214 million contract to build 649 ISVs. The total Army requirement is 2,065 ISVs. The first delivery is to be made to the 1st Brigade, 82nd Airborne Division.  The vehicles will rely heavily on motorsport technology, with suspension modifications from Rod Hall Products, which sells modifications for the road-going version of the Colorado ZR2, and chassis modifications are to be built in Mooresville, North Carolina by Hendrick Motorsports. Vehicles will be delivered from GM's new Charlotte Technical Center in Concord, North Carolina.

GM Defense has since converted one of its bid vehicles for the ISV to an all-electric version. A variant of the ISV, carrying a .50 caliber gun and five infantrymen was on display at AUSA in October 2021.

In January 2022, the Pentagon's chief weapons tester reported the vehicle would be unsuitable against a "near-peer threat," although the Army contended that the platform is intended to act as a troop carrier and not as a fighting vehicle; units are supposed to avoid threats or dismount if engaged rather than fight from the vehicles themselves.

References

Soft-skinned vehicles
Military vehicles of the United States
Military light utility vehicles
Military vehicles introduced in the 2020s